The Blue Ribbon Award for Best Screenplay is a prize recognizing the work of a screenplay of a Japanese film. It was awarded annually by the Association of Tokyo Film Journalists as one of the Blue Ribbon Awards. It was lastly awarded in 1966 at the 17th Blue Ribbon Awards and discontinued.

List of winners

References

External links
Blue Ribbon Awards on IMDb

Awards established in 1950
Recurring events established in 1950
1950 establishments in Japan
Screenplay
Screenwriting awards for film